The fourth election to Grampian Regional Council was held on 8 May 1986 as part of the wider 1986 Scottish regional elections. The election saw the Conservatives suffering heavy losses, which were in turn picked up by the various other parties. The Labour Party emerged as the single largest force on the 57 seat council, although all parties fell well short of the 29 seats needed for a majority. The election was particularly devastating for the Conservatives in the region given that they had controlled the council since its creation in 1974.

Following the election control of the council was undertaken by a minority administration composed of Independent, SNP, and SDP-Liberal Alliance councillors. The councils new convenor was the Independent councillor Geoffrey Hadley.

Turnout was particularly low, at 35.72%; the lowest in Scotland.

Aggregate results

Ward results

References

20th century in Aberdeen
1986
1986 Scottish local elections